The Humanist Party is a progressive political party in Argentina and is a member of the Humanist International. The party was founded in 1984 by Luis Alberto Ammann.

Its "five basic points" are:
 The human being as a value and central focus
 Nonviolence as method of action
 The principle of options (economic, organizational, and ideological)
 Nondiscrimination
 A new kind of economy
The party is currently a member of the Front for Victory.

The party is part of the Frente de Todos coalition supporting the 2019 Argentine presidential candidate Alberto Fernandez during the 2019 Argentine general election.

References

External links
Official website
Buenos Aires site
Córdoba site
La Pampa site
Tucumán site

1984 establishments in Argentina
Argentina
Argentina
Kirchnerism
Left-wing parties in Argentina
Political parties established in 1984
Political parties in Argentina